KLL or kll may refer to:

 KLL, the IATA code for Levelock Airport, Alaska, United States
 KLL, the station code for Kalol Junction railway station, Gujarat, India
 kll, the ISO 639-3 code for Kagan Kalagan language, Mindanao, Philippines